In fluid dynamics and electrostatics, slender-body theory is a methodology that can be used to take advantage of the slenderness of a body to obtain an approximation to a field surrounding it and/or the net effect of the field on the body. Principal applications are to Stokes flow — at very low Reynolds numbers — and in electrostatics.

Theory for Stokes flow 

Note that the Stokes' paradox implies that the limit of infinite aspect ratio  is singular, as no Stokes flow can exist around an infinite cylinder.

Slender-body theory allows us to derive an approximate relationship between the velocity of the body at each point along its length and the force per unit length experienced by the body at that point.

The fluid velocity  at a general point  due to such a distribution can be written in terms of an integral of the Oseen tensor (named after Carl Wilhelm Oseen), which acts as a Greens function for a single Stokeslet. We have
 
where  is the identity tensor.

Since , we approximate . We then obtain
 
where .

The expression may be inverted to give the force density in terms of the motion of the body:
 

Two canonical results that follow immediately are for the drag force  on a rigid cylinder (length , radius ) moving a velocity  either parallel to its axis or perpendicular to it. The parallel case gives
 
while the perpendicular case gives
 
with only a factor of two difference.

Note that the dominant length scale in the above expressions is the longer length ; the shorter length has only a weak effect through the logarithm of the aspect ratio. In slender-body theory results, there are  corrections to the logarithm, so even for relatively large values of  the error terms will not be that small.

References 
 
 
 

Fluid dynamics